Sharifa Khan is a Bangladeshi civil bureaucrat and the second female secretary at Economic Relations Division, Ministry of finance Bangladesh since 17 July 2022. Prior to the current position, she was a member of the Agriculture, Water Resources and Rural Institute Division of the Bangladesh Planning Commission.

In addition to the above-mentioned posts, she held Additional Secretary (Development) of Bangladesh Commerce Ministry and adjunct faculty, Bangladesh Institute of Governance and Management.

Early life and education 
Sharifa khan was born in Mirzapur upazila of Tangail district. After completed her Bachelor (Honors) and Masters degrees in Economics from Dhaka University she joined Bangladesh Civil service with 9th Batch at 26 January 1991. She completed her 2nd Masters in Development Economics from Australian National University.

Career 
Khan served as director at WTO Cell, Ministry of Commerce in 2012. Khan served as a counselor at the Bangladesh High Commission in the United Kingdom from 2012 to 2017. Apart from that, she worked in Ministry of Agriculture, Bangladesh Public Administration Training Centre (BPATC) and Dhaka Deputy Commissioner's Office.

In 2020, Khan was the additional secretary (development) of the Ministry of Commerce. She argued against a free trade agreement with China.

She is an ex-officio director of Bangladesh Infrastructure Finance Fund Limited.

Khan is a member of the Planning Commission. She is serving as secretary at the Economic Relations Division.

References 

Living people
Bangladeshi civil servants
University of Dhaka alumni
Australian National University alumni
People from Tangail District
Year of birth missing (living people)